The 1990 NAIA Division I football season was the 35th season of college football sponsored by the NAIA, was the 21st season of play of the NAIA's top division for football.

The season was played from August to November 1990 and culminated in the 1990 NAIA Champion Bowl playoffs and the 1990 NAIA Champion Bowl, played this year on December 8, 1990 at Ralph Stocker Stadium in Grand Junction, Colorado, on the campus of Mesa State College.

Central State (OH) defeated Mesa State in the Champion Bowl, 38–16, to win their first NAIA national title. The Marauders won the championship after winning all three games on the road.

Conference changes
 This is the final season that the NAIA officially recognizes a football champion from the Rocky Mountain Athletic Conference. The RMAC, and its five football-playing members, would become an NCAA Division II conference by the 1992 season.

Conference standings

Conference champions

Postseason

See also
 1990 NCAA Division I-A football season
 1990 NCAA Division I-AA football season
 1990 NCAA Division II football season
 1990 NCAA Division III football season

References

 
NAIA Football National Championship